Horacio Hasse (born 13 July 1945) is a Guatemalan footballer. He competed in the men's tournament at the 1968 Summer Olympics.

References

External links
 

1945 births
Living people
Guatemalan footballers
Guatemala international footballers
Olympic footballers of Guatemala
Footballers at the 1968 Summer Olympics
People from Alta Verapaz Department
Association football defenders